Torsional strain may refer to:

 Deformation (mechanics)
 Strain (chemistry)#Torsional strain